The 1912 Utah Agricultural Aggies football team was an American football team that represented Utah Agricultural College (later renamed Utah State University) as an independent during the 1912 college football season. In their fourth season under head coach Clayton Teetzel, the Aggies compiled a 4–2–1 record and outscored opponents by a total of 154 to 40.

The team's 53–0 victory over Wyoming remains the largest margin of victory in the history of the Utah State–Wyoming football rivalry.

Schedule

References

Utah Agricultural
Utah State Aggies football seasons
Utah State Aggies football